Iridomyrmex setoconus is a species of ant in the genus Iridomyrmex. Described by Shattuck and McMillan in 1998, the species is endemic to Australia, and small populations have only been found in Esperance.

References

See also
 List of ants of Australia

Iridomyrmex
Hymenoptera of Australia
Insects described in 1998